Metro Jacksonville was an American news website, blog, and forum focusing on Jacksonville, Florida, U.S. The site offered news, blogs, forums and original content covering urban issues, politics, and culture in the city.

History
Metro Jacksonville was founded by Steve Congro, Dan Herbin, Ennis Davis, Kevin Connor, and Stephen Dare. The site launched on March 13, 2006 as a weblog with the intention to educate the public on issues that matter to cities. The site provides members a platform for discussion on topics concerning urban core, transit-oriented development, municipal policy, and politics in Jacksonville and the Northeast Florida region.

Awards
First Coast American Planning Association gave Metro Jacksonville its Excellence in Media Award in 2008. The Florida Chapter of the American Planning Association recognized the publication with its 2009 Outstanding Public Interest Group Award. In 2010, local alternative weekly Folio Weekly named Metro Jacksonville "Best Political Blog".

References

External links

 Official Website
 Metro Jacksonville for mobile devices
 Metro Jacksonville on Twitter
 Metro Jacksonville on Facebook
 Metro Jacksonville on WJXT

Mass media in Jacksonville, Florida
Companies based in Jacksonville, Florida
Internet properties established in 2006